Amblyscirtes phylace (the orange-headed roadside-skipper or red-headed roadside skipper) is a species of butterfly of the family Hesperiidae. It is found from Colorado, New Mexico, Arizona and western Texas to Mexico.

Adults feed on flower nectar.

References

External links
Butterflies and Moths of North America

Hesperiinae
Butterflies of North America
Butterflies described in 1878